Sunny Delight Beverages Co. is the creator of SunnyD, formally known as Sunny Delight. It spun off from Procter & Gamble in 2004. The company is owned by Harvest Hill Beverage Company.

History 

The original predecessor of Sunny Delight Beverages Co., Sunny Delight, was founded in 1963 in Florida by Howard Dick and Phil Grinnell. In 1966, it was purchased by a Coca-Cola bottling operation who later, in 1982, sold it and its now parent company, Doric Foods, to the bottler's parent, The Coca-Cola Company.

Doric Foods was then sold in 1983 to a joint venture between Charterhouse Group International and American Fruit Co., creating Sundor Brands Inc. Sundor was acquired by Procter & Gamble in 1989. In the late 1990s, SunnyD expanded into both Canada and Europe.

In 2004, Sunny Delight Beverages Co. was established when J. W. Childs, a Boston-based private equity firm, acquired Sunny Delight brands from Procter & Gamble. Through the 2000s, the company expanded its product offering launching the Elations brand in 2007 and acquiring Veryfine and Fruit20 from Kraft in the same year. In 2009, it acquired Bossa Nova from that brand's founder.

Sunny Delight Europe was sold to Orangina Schweppes in 2011 and in 2016 J. W. Childs sold Sunny Delight Beverages Co. to Brynwood Partners.

Operations 
The company’s main headquarters are located in Blue Ash, Ohio with a head count of 615 employees. It operates five manufacturing plants located in the United States.

Sustainability efforts and achievements 
Sunny Delight has set goals in three sustainability areas: environmental, economic and social.

Environmental efforts in 2013 
 Sunny Delight Beverages Company (SDBC) reduced packaging materials by 37 million pounds since 2005. Their corrugated reduction alone represented 26 million pounds.
 94.5% of transportation miles were on SmartWay-certified carriers
 Continued use of a compressed natural gas (CNG) delivery fleet in the Los Angeles area created annualized savings of 320,000 gallons of diesel fuel.
 Realized a 23% reduction in carbon inventory versus previous year (in 2013)
 Saw 13% reduction in per-unit non-product related water usage.
 Reused, re-circulated or recycled 3.1 billion gallons of water in 2013.
 Accomplished a 4.4% reduction in per-unit energy usage

Economic achievements 
SDBC seeks to increase profits through stewardship of resources and improvements in the taste, healthiness, and packaging of their products.
 Recycling efforts are a revenue stream
 Introduced three new products that they believe will help increase revenue and volume as consumers become aware of and purchase them: SunnyD pouches geared toward the lunchbox occasion; SunnyD Chillers to satisfy consumers during thirstquenching occasions; and Sparkling Fruit2O to provide consumers with the excitement of carbonation married with natural fruit flavors and a trusted brand name.
 Significantly increased the use of aseptic packaging capability – a process generating great tasting, preservative free products.

Social efforts 
As of 2013, SDBC accomplished the following in employee health improvements:

 Motivated healthy behavior changes by rewarding employees up to $300/year for maintaining/improving specific biometric measures.
 Developed innovative competitions using employees’ Nike+Fuelbands to encourage exercise.
They also made significant contributions to local communities in the following ways:
 Contributed $744,000 in monetary and product donations to more than 100 national and local organizations.
 Donated another 234,000 books to classrooms through SunnyD Book Spree, for a total donation of more than $6 million worth of books since the program began in 2009.
 Provided 85,000 meals to school children who rely on the school system for weekend meals through SunnyD's "Blessings in a Backpack" promotion, which was a partnership with the Blessings organization.

Products 
SunnyD
Fruit Simple
Elations
Veryfine
Fruit2O

References

External links 
 Official Site

Juice brands
Companies based in Blue Ash, Ohio
Corporate spin-offs